Aidar Metshin (born August 27, 1963 , Naberezhnye Chelny) is a Russian political figure, former mayor of Nizhnekamsk, and a deputy of the 8th State Duma. 

In 1999, Metshin was elected deputy of the Nizhnekamsk United Council of People's Deputies. From 2000 to 2006, he was the administrative director of the Nizhnekamsk Oil Refinery. He left the post to head the Nizhnekamsky District. From 2008 to 2021, he was also the deputy of the City Council and served as a mayor of Nizhnekamsk (re-elected for the post in 2010, 2015, and 2020). Since September 2021, he has served as the deputy of the 8th State Duma. 

He is one of the members of the State Duma the United States Treasury sanctioned on 24 March 2022 in response to the 2022 Russian invasion of Ukraine.

References

1963 births
Living people
United Russia politicians
21st-century Russian politicians
Eighth convocation members of the State Duma (Russian Federation)
Russian individuals subject to the U.S. Department of the Treasury sanctions